The CSDA range is a very close approximation to the average distance traveled by a charged particle as it slows down to rest, calculated in the continuous-slowing-down approximation. In this approximation, the rate of energy loss at every point along the track is assumed to be equal to the same as the total stopping power. Energy-loss fluctuations are neglected. The CSDA range is obtained by integrating the reciprocal of the total stopping power with respect to energy.

References

Further reading
 Bichsel, H., Straggling in thin silicon detectors, Rev. Mod. Phys. 60, 3, 663 - 669, 1988

Experimental particle physics
Nuclear physics